Rossana may refer to:

 Rossana (given name), a feminine Italian given name
 Rossana, Piedmont, Italy
 Rossana (film), a Mexican drama film directed by Emilio Fernández

See also 
 Rossana Lower and Rossana Upper, townlands of County Wicklow
 Rosanna House, County Wicklow
 Rosanna (disambiguation)
 Rossano (disambiguation)
 Roxanna (disambiguation)